Niyarak (also Romanized as Nīyārak, Nīārak, Neyarak,  Niaraki and Nīarīk) is a village in Niyarak Rural District, Tarom Sofla District, Qazvin County, Qazvin Province, Iran. At the 2006 census, its population was 590, in 204 families.
Most of the families are still residing in the city of Qazvin but few of the main families have migrated to the northern province of Gilan.The people of this village are Azerbaijani and speak Azerbaijani Turkish.

References 

Populated places in Qazvin County